Ellina Aleksandrovna Zvereva (born 16 November 1960 in Dolgoprudny) is a Belarusian former discus thrower best known for winning the gold medal at the 2000 Summer Olympics. She became world champion in 1995, and again in 2001 after the disqualification of Natalya Sadova. Her victory in 2001 made her the oldest World Champion ever, at 40 years and 269 days.

Her personal best is 71.58m. She retired in 2010 as one of the last remaining athletes to have competed for the Soviet Union.

Doping
In 1992 she tested positive for anabolic steroids.

Achievements

See also
 List of sportspeople sanctioned for doping offences

References

External links
 

Belarusian sportspeople in doping cases
Soviet sportspeople in doping cases
Doping cases in athletics
Belarusian female discus throwers
Athletes (track and field) at the 1988 Summer Olympics
Athletes (track and field) at the 1996 Summer Olympics
Athletes (track and field) at the 2000 Summer Olympics
Athletes (track and field) at the 2004 Summer Olympics
Athletes (track and field) at the 2008 Summer Olympics
1960 births
Living people
Olympic gold medalists for Belarus
Olympic bronze medalists for Belarus
Olympic athletes of Belarus
World Athletics Championships medalists
European Athletics Championships medalists
Medalists at the 2000 Summer Olympics
Medalists at the 1996 Summer Olympics
Olympic gold medalists in athletics (track and field)
Olympic bronze medalists in athletics (track and field)
Goodwill Games medalists in athletics
CIS Athletics Championships winners
World Athletics Championships winners
Competitors at the 2001 Goodwill Games
Goodwill Games gold medalists in athletics